
Gmina Stary Dzierzgoń is a rural gmina (administrative district) in Sztum County, Pomeranian Voivodeship, in northern Poland.

The gmina holds part of the protected area called Iława Lake District Landscape Park.

Villages
Gmina Stary Dzierzgoń contains the villages and settlements of Adamowo, Bądze, Bartne Łąki, Białe Błoto, Bucznik, Danielówka, Folwark, Gisiel, Giślinek, Górki, Kielmy, Kołtyniany, Kornele, Królikowo, Latkowo, Lipiec, Lubochowo, Matule, Milikowo, Monasterzysko Małe, Monasterzysko Nowe, Monasterzysko Wielkie, Mortąg, Myślice, Najatki, Nowy Folwark, Piaski Morąskie, Podwiejki, Pogorzele, Popity, Porzecze, Pronie, Prońki, Protajny, Przezmark, Pudłowiec, Skolwity, Stare Miasto, Stary Dzierzgoń, Tabory, Wartule, Wesoła Kępa, Zakręty and Zamek.

Neighbouring gminas
Gmina Stary Dzierzgoń is bordered by the gminas of Dzierzgoń, Małdyty, Mikołajki Pomorskie, Prabuty, Rychliki, Susz and Zalewo.

References
Polish official population figures 2006

Stary Dzierzgon
Sztum County